Elaine Kasilag (born August 15, 1994) is a Filipina volleyball player. She currently plays for the F2 Logistics Cargo Movers in the Premier Volleyball League.

Clubs
  PLDT Home Ultera Ultra Fast Hitters (2015)
  Pocari Sweat Lady Warriors  (2016-2018)
  Pocari-Air Force Lady Jet Spikers (2018)
  Chery Tiggo Crossovers (2019-2022)
  F2 Logistics Cargo Movers (2022–present)

Awards

Clubs

References

Living people
Filipino women's volleyball players
Outside hitters
Opposite hitters
1994 births